Dorottya Erdős (born 3 April 1979 in Budapest) is a Hungarian sport shooter. She finished fifth in sport pistol shooting at the 2003 European Championships in Plzen, Czech Republic, and was selected to represent Hungary at the 2004 Summer Olympics. Erdos also trains under her longtime coach Attila Győrik for Budapest's Central Sports School Association.

Erdos qualified for the Hungarian squad in pistol shooting at the 2004 Summer Olympics in Athens. She managed to get a minimum qualifying score of 580 in the sport pistol to join with her fellow markswoman Zsófia Csonka and gain an Olympic quota place for Hungary, following her fifth-place finish at the European Championships a year earlier. In the 10 m air pistol, held on the third day of the Games, Erdos fired a frustrating 379 out of a possible 400 to share a twenty-first place with three other shooters. In her signature event, the 25 m pistol, Erdos ended up in an unfortunate aim throughout the competition, as she shot a lowly 278 in the precision stage and 279 in the rapid fire for a total score of 557 points, slipping down to thirty-fourth in a two-way tie with Switzerland's Cornelia Frölich.

References

External links

1979 births
Living people
Hungarian female sport shooters
Olympic shooters of Hungary
Shooters at the 2004 Summer Olympics
Sport shooters from Budapest
21st-century Hungarian women